Novoye Mugri (Dargwa: Сагаси Мугри) is a rural locality (a selo) and the administrative centre of Novomugrinsky Selsoviet, Sergokalinsky District, Republic of Dagestan, Russia. The population was 624 as of 2010. There is 1 street.

Geography 
Novoye Mugri is located 14 km northeast of Sergokala (the district's administrative centre) by road. Leninkent, Utamysh and Myurego are the nearest rural localities.

Nationalities 
Dargins live there.

References 

Rural localities in Sergokalinsky District